Rai Sahib Nagendra Kumar Bhattacharyya (5 November 1888 – 8 April 1967) was an eminent Indian criminal lawyer practising in the High Court of Calcutta and a Member of the West Bengal Legislative Council.

Early life
Rai Sahib Nagendra Kumar Bhattacharyya was born into an orthodox Brahmin  family in Tripura. He was educated at Nawab's H. E. School, Murshidabad and later at Krishna Nath College, Berhampore. He received a Government Scholarship and graduated from the University of Calcutta in law in 1913 in the first division. He received a jagir from the Nawab of Murshidabad and was zamindar of eminence in Murshidabad. He was married to Snehalata Devi of Mymensingh, daughter of Rai Bahadur Kedar Nath Chowdhury of the Zamindar House of Bamui and who was also the first Bengali District & Sessions Judge of Undivided Bengal. Rai Sahib Nagendra Kumar Bhattacharyya officiated as the Government Pleader for Murshidabad in 1932 and was retained Advocate of the Court of Murshidabad. In 1934, he was given the title of Rai Sahib. He was Commissioner of the Berhampore Municipality from 1932 to 1948 and Member of the West Bengal Legislative Council from June 1956 to June 1964. 
He is mentioned in the book 'Bansha-Parichay' that documents eminent noble and aristocratic family lineages of undivided Bengal in British India. He was one of the select noblemen invited to attend the coronation durbar of King George V, Emperor of India.

Career

He joined the Murshidabad District Bar as a pleader in 1913. He enrolled as an Advocate at Berhampore in 1931.
He started practicing in civil and criminal law in Berhampore and was enrolled as an Advocate of the Calcutta High Court in 1931. In 1932 he officiated as the Government Pleader of Murshidabad.

Bhattacharyya was retained Advocate of the Court of Murshidabad. In 1934 he was given the title Rai Sahib. He was Commissioner of the Berhampore Municipality from 1932 to 1948. He was member of the West Bengal Legislative Council from June 1956 to June 1964.

On 12 March 1967, the Berhampore Bar Association celebrated the Golden Jubilee of his practice.

Bhattacharyya was a jagirdar in the State of Murshidabad. He is mentioned in the book 'Bansha-Parichay' that documents the lineage of eminent families lineages of undivided Bengal in British India. He was one of the select noblemen invited to attend the Delhi Durbar of King George V, Emperor of India.

Other positions 
 Director, West Bengal Provincial Co-operative Bank
 Director, City Murshidabad Co-operative Society
 Vice Chairman, West Bengal Central Co-operative Land Mortgage Bank
 Member, Law Sub Committee, All India Co-operative Union
 Member, Working Group on Industrial Co-operatives appointed by Ministry of Commerce and Industry, Govt. of India
 Member, Executive Committee National Co-operative Land Mortgage Bank
 Vice Chairman, Berhampore Central Co-operative Bank
 Vice Chairman, Murshidabad District Co-operative Land Mortgage Bank
 Vice Chairman, Berhampore Co-operative Ganja Farming Society
 Vice President, Murshidabad Institute of Technology
 President, Berhampore Ramkrishna Mission

Publications

 The cattle trespass act, 1871 (I of 1871) as modified up to 1958
 The code of criminal procedure (Act V of 1898) as amended up to date, with the Criminal law amendment act
 The Medico-Legal Court Companion
 The law of motor vehicles in India

Personal
Bhattacharyya was father to four sons and three daughters. He died on 8 April 1967 at Calcutta, aged 78.

References

Members of the West Bengal Legislative Assembly
1888 births
1967 deaths
20th-century Indian lawyers
People from Tripura
Judges of the Calcutta High Court
Indian lawyers